Easts Rugby Union Club, known as Easts or Easts Tigers, is an Australian rugby union club based in Brisbane. The club plays in the Queensland Premier Rugby competition, and fields teams for males and females in several other grades and age-group competitions.

Easts draws players mainly from Eastern and Southern suburbs of Brisbane, ranging from West End to Capalaba, and south to Mt Gravatt. The club's home ground is Bottomley Park at Coorparoo. The junior club boasts over 1000 players ranging from Tiger Cubs, Under 6 to Under 17.

The club was founded in 1947 and has won the Hospital Cup for the Queensland Premiership five times.

History
The history of Easts Rugby Union Club began in 1947 with the formation of a team of past students from Brisbane State High School. The club assumed the name Eastern Districts at the suggestion of the QRU in 1949. Easts Rugby Union was incorporated as a not-for-profit association in the early 2010s.

Easts played in lower grade competitions in Brisbane before being promoted to first grade in 1950. The club's first Premiership came in 1997, 50 years after the club's founding. Easts also won the Australian Club Championship in 2009 and 2021.

Grand Final results

Premiers (Hospital Challenge Cup)
 1997 Easts 18-16 Souths
 1999 Easts 16-15 Wests
 2008 Easts 22-21 Brothers
 2013 Easts 27-22 GPS
 2020 Easts 33-18 University

Runners-Up (Vince Nicholls Memorial Trophy)
 1971 Brothers 17-3 Easts
 1984 Brothers 18-3 Easts
 1995 Souths 27-11 Easts
 2002 Canberra 45-3 Easts
 2015 Souths 39-12 Easts

International representatives

Australia

 Paul Kahl
 Jeremy Paul
 David Wilson
 Gene Fairbanks
Andrew Walker (rugby)
 Peter McLean
 Selena Worsley (Women's)

 Ed Quirk
 Ben Mowen
 Ross Cullen
 Bruce Cook
 Nigel Holt

Fiji
 Jacob Rauluni
 Mosese Rauluni
 Seta Tawake

See also

 Queensland Premier Rugby
 Rugby union in Queensland

References

External links
 Easts Tigers - Official website

Rugby union teams in Queensland
Sporting clubs in Brisbane
1947 establishments in Australia
Rugby clubs established in 1947